Mary Hoyt Wiborg (January 28, 1888 – March 27, 1964) was an American playwright, art patron, and socialite. She wrote the 1922 play Taboo that starred Paul Robeson.

Wiborg was born in Cincinnati to businessman Frank Bestow Wiborg.  Her mother was a daughter of financier Hoyt Sherman, and a niece of General William Tecumseh Sherman and Senator John Sherman. She had two sisters, Olga Wiborg and Sara Sherman Wiborg.

Wiborg lived in Paris, France, and according to her obituary in The New York Times, was active in the Red Cross and, during World War II, served in the French Resistance. She was a Chevalier of the French Legion of Honor.

References

External links

1888 births
1964 deaths
People from East Hampton (town), New York
American women dramatists and playwrights
20th-century American dramatists and playwrights
20th-century American women writers